Benjamin John Lynch (born November 18, 1972, in Santa Rosa, California) is a former professional American football center who played four seasons in the National Football League for the San Francisco 49ers.

Professional career

Kansas City Chiefs
Lynch was drafted by the Kansas City Chiefs in the seventh round (211th overall) of the 1996 NFL Draft. He was released on August 20.

Minnesota Vikings
Lynch was signed by the Minnesota Vikings on February 10, 1997.

Frankfurt Galaxy
Lynch was selected by the Frankfurt Galaxy in the first round (second overall) of the 1998 NFL Europe Draft.

Houston Texans
The Houston Texans signed Lynch on August 4, 2003. He suffered a season-ending knee injury in a preseason game against the San Diego Chargers on August 23. The Texans placed him on the injured reserve list on August 25.

References

External links
 Ben Lynch NFL & AFL Football Statistics - Pro-Football-Reference.com

1972 births
Living people
Sportspeople from Santa Rosa, California
Players of American football from California
American football centers
California Golden Bears football players
Frankfurt Galaxy players
San Francisco 49ers players